The Commonwealth Youth Games (CYG) is an international multi-sport event organized by the Commonwealth Games Federation. The games were held in the years, mid-way between when the Commonwealth Games are held, until 2008. They continued to be held every four years, but in the year after the Commonwealth Games are held, from 2011 to 2015. Since 2017, they've been held in the year before the Commonwealth Games are held. The first edition was held in Edinburgh, Scotland from 10–14 August 2000. The age limitation of the athletes is from 14 to 18.

History 
The Commonwealth Games Federation discussed the idea of a Commonwealth Youth Games in 1997.  In 1998 the concept was agreed on for the purpose of providing a Commonwealth multi-sport event for young people born in 1986 or later.

Editions of the games
The first edition of the Commonwealth Youth Games were held in Edinburgh, Scotland from 10 to 14 August 2000. Fifteen countries contested 483 medals over three days of competition in eight sports. A total of 773 athletes, 280 Technical Officials and around 500 volunteers participated in the event. Eight sports were contested.  These included: Athletics, Fencing, Gymnastics, Hockey, Lawn Tennis, Squash, Swimming and Weightlifting.

The second edition of the Commonwealth Youth Games was held in Bendigo, Australia from 30 November to 4 December 2004, 22 countries participated and contested in 10 sports events spread over a period of 3 days, which included Athletics, Badminton, Boxing, Lawn Bowls, Rugby 7’s, Tenpin Bowling, Swimming, Cycling, Gymnastics and Weightlifting.980 athletes and team officials were involved in the Games in Bendigo.

The third edition of the Commonwealth Youth Games was held in Pune, India from 12 to 18 October 2008. Over 1,220 athletes and 350 officials from 71 countries participated in these games, in 9 disciplines – Athletics, Badminton, Boxing, Shooting, Swimming, Table Tennis, Tennis, Weightlifting and Wrestling.

The fourth edition of the Commonwealth Youth Games was held in Isle of Man from 7 to 13 September 2011. 811 athletes from 64 commonwealth nations competed at the 2011 Commonwealth Youth Games.

The fifth edition of the Commonwealth Youth Games was held in Apia from 5 to 11 September 2015, the capital of Samoa. Samoa were the only bidders for the Games. Around 807 athletes from 65 nations and territories participated in the nine sports: aquatics, archery, athletics, boxing, lawn bowls, rugby sevens, squash, tennis and weightlifting.

The sixth edition of the Commonwealth Youth Games was held in Nassau, Bahamas. The games were held from 18 to 23 July 2017. The sports contested at the Bahamas 2017 were Athletics, Swimming, Beach Soccer, Boxing, Cycling (Road), Judo, Rugby Sevens, Tennis and Beach Volleyball. It was the first time Judo, Beach Soccer and Beach Volleyball have been presented at a Commonwealth Youth Games.

The seventh edition of the Commonwealth Youth Games was scheduled to be held in Port of Spain, Trinidad and Tobago between 1 and 7 August 2021. However, it was postponed due to the COVID-19 pandemic. It will now be held from 4 to 11 August 2023.

List of Commonwealth Youth Games

Sports

 (2000–present)

 (2004–2015)
  (2017)
  (2017)
 (2004)
 (2004)
 (2004–present)
 (2004, 2011,2017)
 (2000)
 (2000)
 (2004, 2011)
 Judo (2017)
 (2004, 2001,2017)
 (2008)
 (2000)
 (2000–present)
 (2008)
 (2000, 2008,2017)
 (2000–2008)
 (2008)

Medal table
An all-time Commonwealth Youth Games from 2000 Commonwealth Youth Games to 2017 Commonwealth Youth Games, is tabulated below. The table is simply the consequence of the sum of the medal tables of the various editions of the Commonwealth Youth Games.

See also

Summer Youth Olympics
Asian Youth Games

References

External links
 Official website

 

Youth
Youth multi-sport events
Recurring sporting events established in 2000

id:Commonwealth Youth Games